Cornelia Hilda Kühn (born 11 December 1944) is an Afrikaans writer known under the pen-name Corlia Fourie. She won the ATKV-prize for the short story anthology Liefde en geweld and the MER prize for Die towersak en ander stories. In 1995, she received the Alba Bouwer Prize.

Biography
She is the daughter of the writer Mikro (C H Kühn). She writes drama, children's books, short stories and novels. Her drama Moeders en dogters was adapted for television and radio and also presented by Kruik.

Books 
 Marianne en die leeu in die pophuis, 1982
 Moeders en dogters, 1985/92
 Leuens, 1986
 En die son skyn in Suid-Afrika, 1986
 Die volstruisie wat graag wou vlieg, 1986
 Die meisie wat soos 'n bottervoël sing
 Tintinyane, the girl who sang like a magic bird, 1990
 Jakkalsstreke, 1991
 Liefde en geweld (kortstories), Tafelberg, 1992
 Ganekwane en die groen draak, 1992
 Vrou-mens, Verhale deur vroue oor vroue (kompilasie), 1993
 Die deurmekaardier, 1993
 Sê (kortstories), 1994
 Die towersak, 1995
 Die oop deur, 1996
 Nolito en die wonderwater, 1997
 Die wit vlinder, Tafelberg, 1993
 Want die lewe is goed – keur uit die werk van Mikro, Lapa, 2003
 Ware liefde: bekende Suid-Afrikaanse paartjiesWare liefde: bekende Suid-Afrikaanse paartjies, Human & Rousseau, 2008
 Heleen en die heks met die hoofpyn, Protea Boekhuis, 2008
 Alle paaie lei deur die strand, LAPA 2008
 Die geheime kamer, LAPA 2012
 Harry Potter and the Philosophers Stone, Tafelberg, 1998
3am Thoughts, a collection of poems, short stories and smut, Penguin Books, 2021

References 

1944 births
Living people
Afrikaans-language writers
South African children's writers
South African women children's writers
20th-century South African women writers
21st-century South African women writers